94th meridian may refer to:

94th meridian east, a line of longitude east of the Greenwich Meridian
94th meridian west, a line of longitude west of the Greenwich Meridian